is a private junior college in Higashiōsaka, Osaka, Japan.

History 
The junior college was founded in 1965 as a women's college. In 1966, the Child care department was set up. In 2001, the junior college became coeducational. In 2011, the Certified Care Work course was discontinued.

External links 
  

Educational institutions established in 1965
Japanese junior colleges
Private universities and colleges in Japan
Universities and colleges in Osaka Prefecture
1965 establishments in Japan
Higashiōsaka